Hugo Omar Cóccaro (4 May 1954 – 21 July 2019) was an Argentine Justicialist Party (PJ) politician, who served as governor of Tierra del Fuego Province (formerly Tierra del Fuego, Antarctica, and South Atlantic Islands).

Life
Born in Saladillo, Buenos Aires Province, Cóccaro relocated to Tierra del Fuego at age 20 with his brother, with whom he started a construction firm. He later purchased the San Justo Estancia, a lenga beech sawmill near Río Grande. He had four daughters, and his marriage ended in separation.

Cóccaro entered politics in 2003, when he was elected vice-governor under Governor Jorge Colazo of the Radical Civic Union (UCR).  He fell out with Colazo, however, and there were public rows between them. He became acting governor of Tierra del Fuego on 25 October 2005, when Colazo was suspended, and was confirmed in the post on 2 December.

His tenure was marked by its failed support for RENASA, a provincial petroleum concern, and a subsequent impeachment. Cóccaro was not removed in his impeachment. Cóccaro ran for reelection in 2007, and won the first round; but he was defeated in the runoff by Fabiana Ríos, the first woman to be elected governor in the history of Argentina. 

Cóccaro died on 21 July 2019 in Buenos Aires at the age of 65. The cause was cancer.

References

External links
 Tierra de Fuego Province

1954 births
2019 deaths
People from Buenos Aires Province
Argentine people of Italian descent
Argentine businesspeople
Governors of Tierra del Fuego Province, Argentina
Vice Governors of Tierra del Fuego Province, Argentina
Justicialist Party politicians
Impeached governors
Impeached Argentinian officials